Planners Athletic Club, formerly Okyeman Planners Football Club, is a professional football club based in Tafo, Eastern Region, Ghana, that competes in division one (zone three), the second-tier of Ghanaian football. The club's maiden season in the first division saw them placed second to leaders Great Olympics of the 2015-2016 league season. George Afriyie is the owner and President of Planners Athletic Club.

History

The owner of Okyeman Planners F.C. in 2019 stated that he founded the club in 2000, but as at 2020 the club has the year 2015 on its badge.

The badge of Okyeman Planners F.C. included the motto Yen Nhwe Ma Ensei.

In February 2017, the club's match venue was decertified by the Club Licensing Board of the Ghana Football Association. The club needed to find another venue for upcoming home games, and are now based at the CRIA Park, New Tafo.

On changing the name of the club in February 2020 from Okyeman Planners F.C. to Planners Athletic Club, the nickname was changed from The Planners to The Executioners.

Former players
William Opoku began his career with Okyeman Planners F.C., and Prosper Avor played for the club in 2015 and 2016.

Head coach 
Coach Emmanuel Bulley was appointed head coach of Planners Athletic Club in February 2020.

Current squad

Management members 

 Administrative Manager - Kwaku Boadu
 Communications Manager - Emmanuel Akyereko Frimpong

References

External links
 Official website

Football clubs in Ghana
Eastern Region (Ghana)